Lviv Today is a Ukrainian English-language magazine published in Lviv, Ukraine.

History and profile
Lviv Today was founded in May 2008. The magazine is owned and issued by English journalist Peter Dickinson who moved to Ukraine roughly ten years ago. 

The magazine focuses on foreign businessmen, politicians, tourists, as well as on local residents. Its content includes information about business, advertisement and entertainment spheres in Lviv, and the country in general.

As of 2011 Andrew Lewis was appointed editor-in-chief of the magazine.

See also
List of magazines in Ukraine

References

2008 establishments in Ukraine
Magazines established in 2008
Monthly magazines
Magazines published in Ukraine
English-language magazines
Mass media in Lviv
Local interest magazines